Highland Springs (formerly Highland) is a set of springs which was turned into a resort in the 19th century in Lake County, California. The resort grew to be able to accommodate 200 people, attracted by the curative powers of the mineral waters and the lovely mountain scenery. In the 1920s its popularity waned, the hotel was partly burned, and it passed through various hands before the county claimed eminent domain, bought the property, and flooded it with the Highland Springs Reservoir. The reservoir is surrounded by the Highland Springs Recreation Area, managed by the county.

Location

They are in the edge of the mountains that border the flat Big Valley area to the west of Clear Lake (California). It is at an elevation of 1483 feet (452 m). OpenStreetMap shows the Old Toll Road branching off to the southeast from the Lakeport–Hopland Road (CA175) just east of Hopland. The road turns east, and when it passes from Mendocino County to Lake County it changes name to Highland Springs Road. It continues east through Highland Springs, then turns north past Highland Springs Reservoir to join CA29 / CA175 just east of Lampson Field and south of Lakeport.

An 1890 guide said the springs could be reached by the Southern Pacific Railroad to Calistoga, then by stage, or by the Northern Pacific Railroad to Cloverdale, then by stage. The stage, whether from Calistoga or from Cloverdale, was exceedingly picturesque, along winding roads through rugged country. Accounts from the early 20th century before CA175 had been built place Highland Springs on the road between Hopland and Kelseyville.

Springs

As of 1910, there were 11  springs.  
The others springs issued west to northwest of the hotel in a distance of about  along the western bank of the creek. All the springs were carbonated, and their basins stained by iron. Small amounts of lime carbonate were deposited at several places. The springs issue mainly from crushed sandstone and shale. They are considered to be thermal carbonated springs, but are mainly known for their carbonated waters.

Seltzer Spring was protected by a latticed spring house and rose in a cemented basin. The water was strongly carbonated and it deposited considerable iron. 

The spring rose in a small drinking pool in the center of an oval cemented basin, several feet across, on a gentle slope at the base of a low bank. Its flow was slight, but it was piped to a small bathing plunge a few yards away. 

Diana Spring and Magnesia Spring rose in cemented basins a few yards apart at the base of a small bank  northward and nearer the creek. Water from Diana supplied a small bathing plunge near by, whereas Magnesia was used only for drinking.

From about 30 to nearly 55 yards beyond the Magnesia Spring much water rose beneath a platform. This water supplied an adjacent bathhouse and was also piped across the creek to a swimming plunge. There were two small pools with slight overflow along the creek bank a few yards north of the bathhouse and an iron-stained seepage area extended about  along the creek edge. Gas bubbles up through the water of the creek at several places.

 beyond, at the northern end of the line of springs, Arsenic and Dutch springs rose in separate compartments of a circular, cemented basin near the creek edge. The Dutch (or Ems) is crystal clear and the Arsenic is milky.

History

Highland Springs began as a resort in the 1870s. The first Highland Springs post office opened in 1875 and closed in 1880. The Highland post office opened in 1880, changed its name to Highland Springs in 1884, and closed in 1921. An 1885 advertisement by Dr. C.M. Bates, Sole Proprietor, described Highland Springs Sanitarium as the Switzerland of America, and said it was "sheltered from the chilling coast winds and fogs by mountains 1,600 feel in height, which, for grandeur and beauty of scenery, are unsurpassed on the Pacific Coast, while the beneficial effects of its mineral waters are equal to any in the United States or Europe. An 1890 guide said,
 

As of 1910 a large frame hotel and half a dozen cottages situated in a small flat along the course of Adobe Creek provided accommodations for 200 guests. In 1914 the owners were Craig & Stephons, Inc., of Woodland. The resort could accommodate 315 guests, and had a resident physician during the summer season.  were being maintained as a fishing and hunting preserve. The water was not bottled for sale.

The resort's mineral waters became less popular in the 1920s. Part of the hotel burned, and the property was sold to Neal Woods, who planned to open a casino on the property. It passed to a sheep rancher, and then to a physician who converted the remains of the hotel into his family home. In the 1960s Lake County bought the property under eminent domain, dammed Highland Creek and Adobe Creek, and flooded the resort property with the Highland Springs Reservoir.

As of 2021 the  Highland Springs Recreation Area was managed by the County of Lake Watershed Protection District. It contained Highland Springs Reservoir and Adobe Reservoir. Vegetation included open range or scrub and oak woodland. The steeper hillsides were mostly open chaparral. Visitors could engage in hiking, horseback riding, mountain biking, disc golf, paddling, fishing, hunting, picnicking and swimming. Highland Springs Disc Golf Course was established in 1980 between the hamlet and the reservoir. The reservoir is stocked with warm water fish such as largemouth bass, sunfish, bluegill, catfish and bullhead.

References

Sources

 

 

Springs of Lake County, California
Resorts in Lake County, California